Flavy-le-Martel is a railway station located in the commune of Flavy-le-Martel in the Aisne department, France. The station is served by TER Hauts-de-France trains from Amiens to Laon.

See also
List of SNCF stations in Hauts-de-France

References

Railway stations in Aisne